The 1998–99 Cypriot Second Division was the 44th season of the Cypriot second-level football league. Anagennisi Deryneia won their 1st title.

Format
Fourteen teams participated in the 1998–99 Cypriot Second Division. All teams played against each other twice, once at their home and once away. The team with the most points at the end of the season crowned champions. The first three teams were promoted to 1999–2000 Cypriot First Division and the last three teams were relegated to the 1999–2000 Cypriot Third Division.

Changes from previous season
Teams promoted to 1998–99 Cypriot First Division
 Olympiakos Nicosia
 Aris Limassol
 Doxa Katokopias

Teams relegated from 1997–98 Cypriot First Division
 Anagennisi Deryneia
 APOP Paphos
 Ethnikos Assia

Teams promoted from 1997–98 Cypriot Third Division
 AEZ Zakakiou
 AEK/Achilleas Ayiou Theraponta
 Anagennisi Germasogeias

Teams relegated to 1998–99 Cypriot Third Division
 Chalkanoras Idaliou
 Iraklis Gerolakkou
 APEP

League standings

Results

See also
 Cypriot Second Division
 1998–99 Cypriot First Division
 1998–99 Cypriot Cup

Sources

Cypriot Second Division seasons
Cyprus
1998–99 in Cypriot football